Great Britain men's national goalball team is the men's national team of Great Britain.  Goalball is a team sport designed specifically for athletes with a vision impairment.  The team  takes part in international competitions.

Paralympic Games  
 

At the 1980 Summer Paralympics in Arnhem, Netherlands, thirteen teams took part.  The team finished 13th.

References

Goalball men's
National men's goalball teams
Great Britain at the Paralympics
Goalball in the United Kingdom
European national goalball teams